Azarshahr County is in East Azerbaijan province, Iran. The capital of the county is the city of Azarshahr. At the 2006 census, the county's population was 99,286 in 26,857 households. The following census in 2011 counted 107,579 people in 31,812 households. At the 2016 census, the county's population was 110,311 in 35,364 households.

Administrative divisions

The population history and structural changes of Azarshahr County's administrative divisions over three consecutive censuses are shown in the following table. The latest census shows two districts, seven rural districts, and four cities.

References

 

Counties of East Azerbaijan Province